The anime series Revolutionary Girl Utena was produced by the Japanese animation studio J.C.Staff and directed by Kunihiko Ikuhara. The series aired between April 2, 1997 and December 24, 1997 on TV Tokyo in Japan and spanned 39 episodes.

Episode list

Student Council Saga
The Student Council Saga begins with Utena Tenjou challenging Kyouichi Saionji to a duel. He thought the love letter Utena's friend Wakaba wrote to him was stupid, and threw it in the trash. Someone, possibly Saionji himself or another student, posted it on the school wall. Utena, assuming Saionji the perpetrator, angrily confronts him about his behavior. She challenges him to a kendo duel; he, seeing the Rose Signet on her hand, accepts a real duel. Each Duelist was given a rose crest ring by the End of the World. Utena also has a rose crest, but hers came from a prince she met when she was very young. By accepting the duel and defeating Saionji, Utena becomes engaged to Anthy Himemiya, the Rose Bride.

Anthy and Utena move into a dormitory together. Saionji comes to the dorms, and physically abuses Anthy for "betraying" him. He demands a rematch against Utena, claiming that he was careless the first time. Utena thinks the duels are stupid, and declares to Anthy that she will deliberately lose. However, Utena is unable to stand the thought of Anthy being abused by Saionji. Motivated by the chance to protect Anthy, Utena wins the duel.

As Utena fights the Student Council members one by one, her relationship with Anthy strengthens. After Saionji, she duels against Miki, Juri and Nanami, defeating all of them. Before fighting Utena, Touga uses his charm and skills at manipulation to make her doubt herself, and is thus able to defeat her. After Utena regains her confidence, she wins a rematch against him, regaining her title as the Champion Duelist.

Black Rose Saga
After defeating all of the Student Council members, another obstacle appears before Utena with the opening of the Mikage Seminar. Presided over by Souji Mikage, it is seemingly a place for student counseling. But once people reveal their problems and inner turmoil to Mikage, he uses his powers to put them under his control, turning them into Black Rose duelists and sending them to fight duels against Utena in the Arena. His objective is to kill Anthy and install a boy, Mamiya Chida, as the Rose Bride instead. His efforts are in vain, as not one of them can defeat Utena.

Mikage's victims included Kanae Ohtori, Kozue Kaoru, Shiori Takatsuki, Mitsuru Tsuwabuki, Wakaba Shinohara, and Keiko Sonoda.

After being forced to fight even her best friend to protect Anthy, an enraged Utena challenges Mikage in order to end his schemes once and for all. After she defeats him, Akio tells him his role in his plot was already fulfilled, and disposes of him. In the process, it is implied that Mamiya was somehow a disguised Anthy, helping Akio to manipulate Mikage. The real Mamiya is long dead, as is Mikage.

Akio Ohtori Saga
After being expelled from the Academy for injuring Touga, Saionji is given permission to return to Ohtori, and he immediately challenges Utena to another duel. During the fight, the Sword of Dios disappears, and Utena defeats Saionji with a sword Anthy draws from Utena's own body. Akio later appears before Touga and takes him to an unknown place he calls "the End of the World". Akio and Touga take each Student Council member to the End of the World in turn, and after going there, each one chooses a "bride" to take a sword from their hearts in order to fight Utena. The eventual victor of the duels will be determined by the strength of the bond between the Duelist and the Bride — and whether that bond can overcome Utena's bond with Anthy. Miki chooses Kozue as his bride; Ruka Tsuchiya, who returned recently to the academy, chooses Shiori; Juri brings Ruka; and Nanami brings Touga. However, even with the help of their brides, they all lose their duels against Utena.

Akio warns Touga that his next match with Utena will decide the true champion, but before the duel, Touga and Saionji discover more about Utena's origin, as they remember having found her in a coffin at her parents' funeral. Little by little, the mysteries surrounding Anthy, Akio and the duels start to unravel. Touga discovers his true feelings for Utena, and in order to protect her, he brings Saionji as his "bride" to fight her one last time, afraid of what could happen to her if she becomes the final victor. After losing the duel, he tries to warn her about Akio and Anthy's true intentions.

Despite Touga's warnings, Utena decides to go with Anthy once more to the duel stage in order to meet the prince from her past, only to discover that the arena is an illusion created by Akio to steal her heart's sword. Rather than submit to Akio's proffered fairytale ending at Anthy's expense, Utena decides to fight Akio and protect Anthy from him. Anthy, however, is complicit in her brother's schemes and literally stabs Utena in the back, allowing Akio to take her sword. He attempts to use it to open the gates that are said to seal the Power of Dios, but the sword breaks and Akio gives up. When Utena sees how much Anthy is suffering from her past, she opens the gate with her bare hands to find Anthy inside. Utena reaches out to Anthy, trying again to save her, and Anthy reaches for her hand. When they touch, the entire duel stage crumbles and Utena is attacked by the Swords of Hatred which had previously ensnared Anthy. After these events, it is revealed that Utena has disappeared from Ohtori Academy. Later, Akio decides to start the rose duels again, but Anthy informs him that she is leaving the Academy, the links that bound her to the Academy and her brother finally severed by Utena's intervention. The series ends with Anthy leaving the Academy in search of Utena.

References

Notes

Citations

External links

Episodes
Revolutionary Girl Utena

ja:少女革命ウテナ#各話リスト